Arrigo Miglio (born 18 July 1942) is an Italian prelate of the Catholic Church who was Archbishop of Cagliari from  2012 to 2019. He was Bishop of Ivrea from 1999 to 2012 and Bishop of Iglesias from 1992 to 1999.

Pope Francis made Miglio a cardinal on 27 August 2022.

Biography
Miglio was born in San Giorgio Canavese, Piedmont, Italy, and was ordained on 23 September 1967. He was named Bishop of Iglesias on 25 March 1992, and was consecrated by Luigi Bettazzi on the following 25 April.

On 20 February 1999 Miglio was named Bishop of Ivrea. He is president of the scientific committee and organizer of the Social Weeks of Catholic Italians as well as member of the Episcopal Commission of the Italian Episcopal Conference for social issues, labour, justice and peace.

On 25 February 2012 he was named Archbishop of Cagliari by Pope Benedict XVI, and received the metropolitan bishop's pallium on 29 June of the same year. Miglio has been president of the Sardinian Episcopal Conference since 3 September 2012.

On 22 September 2013 he welcomed Pope Francis to Cagliari and accompanied him to all his public appointments.

On 16 November 2019, Pope Francis accepted his resignation as archbishop and named Giuseppe Baturi to succeed him.

On 27 August 2022, Pope Francis made him Cardinal-Priest of San Clemente al Laterano.

See also
 Cardinals created by Pope Francis

References

Additional sources

External links
 

1942 births
Living people
People from San Giorgio Canavese
Italian Roman Catholic archbishops
Members of the Order of the Holy Sepulchre
21st-century Italian cardinals
Cardinals created by Pope Francis